Ian Dryden (29 December 1944 – 30 May 1993), also known as Ian Dryden Pyle, was a Scottish photojournalist and arts photographer who worked in Edinburgh, California and Mexico prior to his death from lung cancer in 1993 at the age of 48. His work has been exhibited in the United States, Mexico and the United Kingdom.

Early life 
Born in London and raised in Wales, in the early 1960s Ian studied engineering and architecture at the University of Edinburgh, where he was enrolled under the name Ian D. Pyle.

Bertrand Russell 
In 1965, he moved to Merionethshire, Wales, where he worked for a year as personal secretary to British philosopher, peace activist and Nobel Laureate Bertrand Russell. On April 1, 1966 in Merionethshire, he married Bertrand Russell's adoptive granddaughter Felicity Anne Russell, who was the granddaughter of the American poet Vachel Lindsay, the daughter of Susan Doniphan Lindsay and adoptive daughter of Russell's eldest son, John Conrad Lindsay, 4th Earl Russell. After their marriage, Ian and Anne left Wales and lived together in Edinburgh from August 1966 until 1971.

Film and Documentary Photography 
In Edinburgh, Ian turned to film-making and photography and during Edinburgh's second theatre fringe festival in 1973 he produced what a reviewer for the Guardian newspaper deemed a "a beautiful film" that was shown as part of an evening tribute to avant garde music composer Eric Satie. Ian is registered as having worked as an Edinburgh-based documentary photographer at least by 1975. Early photographs indicate travel and work in the Far East and Europe in the early 1970s, including a 1974 photograph of vehicle art in Afghanistan and widely reproduced 1975 portraits of the Irish novelist and playwright Samuel Beckett in Paris.

In Edinburgh in 1974, Dryden met Mary Rule, an American graduate student of Shakespearean drama at the University of Edinburgh and aspiring model and stage actress. They married in San Diego, California, on Nov. 22, 1975, with Rule taking the name Dryden both as her married name and stage name thereafter.

Having relocated to San Diego, from 1976-78 he worked as a regular contributor of photographs to the weekly San Diego Reader newspaper. The quality of his work for the Reader attracted the attention of the photo editor at the daily San Diego Union-Tribune newspapers, which hired him as a staff photographer in 1978, a position he held until mid-1983.

In 1983, Dryden left the Union-Tribune and moved to Los Angeles to work as a staff photographer for The Los Angeles Times, then one of the leading daily newspapers in the United States. After three years with the Times, he went to Mexico City for the Times in August 1986 to take photographs accompanying a story about ongoing relief efforts for the 1985 Mexico City earthquake,. Following that assignment, he returned to Los Angeles and by year-end resigned his staff position in order to relocate to Mexico City.

Over the next six years, Dryden worked from Mexico City, accredited as a correspondent for the Gamma-Liaison photo agency and regularly free-lancing work to the Los Angeles Times, The San Diego Union and other print media that included the New York Daily News, the Sacramento Bee, Arizona Daily Star (Tucson) and National Post (Toronto).

Arts photography 
Living in downtown Mexico City, Dryden associated with and photographed the work of members of a group of Mexican and foreign-born conceptual artists then transforming Mexico's art scene that included Belgian artist Francis Alÿs, British artist Melanie Smith and Mexican performance artist Elvira Santamaría Torres, who was Dryden's partner during his last years in Mexico.

Interviewed by Canadian arts journalist Jennifer Morton, Ian was identified in Belong, Morton's subsequent book on emerging art scenes worldwide, as "a British ex-pat photojournalist who feels he is a refugee from his past. He's now a conceptual artist." In the book, Morton quotes Dryden as saying, apparently in reference to Mexico's contemporary art milieu of the time, that "We are living in the last bohemia. Bohemia implies living outside the laws of society, living without money, living as you want in defiance of society."

In addition to his photo-journalism work, Dryden also served during his years in California as company photographer for the San Diego Dance Theater, the L.A. Actors Theater Center and the San Quentin Drama Workshop.

Death 
Ian Dryden died on May 30, 1993 in Cambridgeshire, England. His remains were cremated on June 7, 1993 and scattered by family and friends, in accordance with his wishes.

References 

1944 births
1993 deaths
Alumni of the University of Edinburgh
20th-century British photographers